Poldine is an antimuscarinic that is used to treat peptic ulcers.

References

Muscarinic antagonists
Quaternary ammonium compounds
Pyrrolidines
Tertiary alcohols
Carboxylate esters